Hwanseongsa is a temple located in Gyeongsan, Gyeongsangbuk-do, South Korea.

References 

Buddhist temples in South Korea
Gyeongsan
Buildings and structures in North Gyeongsang Province
Buddhist temples of the Jogye Order